Argonautoidea is a superfamily of the suborder Incirrata containing all known argonautoids.

Classification 

Class Cephalopoda
Subclass Nautiloidea: nautiluses
Subclass †Ammonoidea: ammonites
Subclass Coleoidea
Superorder Decapodiformes: squid, cuttlefish
Superorder Octopodiformes
Family †Trachyteuthididae (incertae sedis)
Order Vampyromorphida: vampire squid
Order Octopoda
Genus †Keuppia (incertae sedis)
Genus †Palaeoctopus (incertae sedis)
Genus †Paleocirroteuthis (incertae sedis)
Genus †Proteroctopus (incertae sedis)
Genus †Styletoctopus (incertae sedis)
Suborder Cirrina: finned deep-sea octopuses
Suborder Incirrata
Superfamily Argonautoidea
Family Alloposidae: the seven-arm octopus
Family Argonautidae: argonauts (paper nautiluses)
Family Ocythoidae: the tuberculate pelagic octopus
Family Tremoctopodidae: blanket octopuses
Superfamily Octopodoidea

Image gallery of families

References 

Octopuses